This is a list of listed buildings in the parish of Troon, in South Ayrshire, Scotland.

List 

|}

Key

Notes

References
 All entries, addresses and coordinates are based on data from Historic Scotland. This data falls under the Open Government Licence

Troon
Troon